Sophie Istillart (born 23 April 1996) is a French retired professional footballer who played as a midfielder.

Club career
Istillart started her career in Les Eglantins D'Hendaye's academy. She joined Bordeaux when the club was formed in 2015, and was the team captain in Division 1 Féminine. In August 2020, she signed for Athletic Club and, in doing so, became the first female footballer from the French Basque Country to do so under their selective signing policy. She made her debut for the club against Logroño in the Copa de la Reina on 7 October 2020.

Istillart sustained a serious injury to her right knee in January 2022, and announced her retirement from playing three months later, at the age of 26.

International career
Istillart has been called up to represent the Basque Country national team.

Personal life
Istillart comes from a family of sportspeople. Her twin sister Carole played for the women's rugby union team of Stade Bordelais. Her aunt, Danièle, and sister, Isabelle, have also played rugby.

References

External links

1996 births
Living people
Women's association football midfielders
French women's footballers
Sportspeople from Bayonne
French-Basque people
FC Girondins de Bordeaux (women) players
Division 1 Féminine players
Athletic Club Femenino players
Primera División (women) players
French twins
Twin sportspeople
French expatriate footballers
Expatriate women's footballers in Spain
French expatriate sportspeople in Spain
Footballers from Nouvelle-Aquitaine